Codringtonia is a genus of air-breathing land snails, terrestrial pulmonate gastropod mollusks in the family Helicidae, the typical snails.

Species
Species within the genus Codringtonia include:

Subgenus Codringtonia Kobelt, 1898
 Codringtonia codringtonii (Gray, 1834) - rock snail - type species
 Codringtonia elisabethae Subai, 2005
 Codringtonia eucineta (Bourguignat, 1857)
 Codringtonia gittenbergeri Subai, 2005
 Codringtonia helenae Subai, 2005
 Codringtonia intusplicata (Pfeiffer, 1851)
 Codringtonia parnassia (Roth, 1855)

Subgenus Neocrassa Subai, 2005
 Codringtonia neocrassa Zilch, 1952

References

 
Helicidae
Gastropod genera
Taxonomy articles created by Polbot